Nelli Vitalyevna Korovkina (born 1 November 1989) is a Russian footballer. She plays as a striker for Lokomotiv Moscow and the Russia national team.

Club career
She played for Izmailovo Moscow from 2009 to 2014. She then played two seasons for Zorky Krasnogorsk and one for Ryazan VDV before signing in 2017 for Chertanovo Moscow and now plays for Lokomotiv Moscow.

International career
In her first match for the national team against Macedonia, she came to the pitch as a substitute and scored two goals. She was called up to be part of the national team for the UEFA Women's Euro 2013.

Personal life
Korovkina was born in Moscow.

Honours
Izmailovo Moscow
Runner-up
 Russian Women's Cup: 2013
Lokomotiv Moscow
Winner
 Russian Women's Football Championship (2) : 2020, 2021
 Russian Women's Cup (2): 2020, 2021
 Russian Women's Supercup (1) : 2021

References

1989 births
Living people
Russian women's footballers
Footballers from Moscow
Russia women's international footballers
CSP Izmailovo players
Women's association football forwards
Ryazan-VDV players
FC Zorky Krasnogorsk (women) players
WFC Lokomotiv Moscow players
FC Chertanovo Moscow (women) players
Russian Women's Football Championship players
21st-century Russian women